Thyrosticta triangulifera is a moth in the subfamily Arctiinae. It was described by Paul Griveaud in 1964. It is found on Madagascar.

References

Moths described in 1964
Arctiinae